Kairon; IRSE! is a progressive rock and shoegaze band from Finland. According to Guitarist Niko Lehdontie, the band's name "means nothing" and is "just meant to be as annoying as possible." Lehdontie has compared the band's sound to Gentle Giant, Todd Rundgren, the Flaming Lips, and My Bloody Valentine. The band has also been compared to King Crimson, Ornette Coleman, Fairport Convention, Jon Anderson, Utopia, and Dream Theater. Clash Magazine has called Kairon; IRSE! "kind of an accidental cult success".

Albums 
 The Defect In That One Is Bleach / We're Hunting Wolverines (2011)
  Ujubasajuba (2014)
  Ruination (2017)
 Polysomn (2020)

References 

Finnish post-rock groups
Musical groups established in 2010
2010 establishments in Finland